Ramaria sanguinea, commonly known as the bleeding coral or the bloody coral, is a coral mushroom in the family Gomphaceae.

Taxonomy
The species was first described by Christian Hendrik Persoon in 1799. It was transferred to the genus Ramaria by Lucien Quélet in 1888.

References

Gomphaceae
Fungi described in 1799
Fungi of Australia
Fungi of Europe
Fungi of North America
Taxa named by Christiaan Hendrik Persoon